Zákamenné is the biggest village in the Orava region in the northern part of Slovakia. Zákamenné lies in the north-western part of Orava. It belongs to the protected landscape area of Horná Orava and the specially protected area of Horná Orava. The villages which surround Zákamenné are Oravská Lesná, Novoť, Lomná, Breza, Krušetnica and Ujsoly in Poland.

History
In historical records the village was first mentioned in 1615. The village was founded in 1615 on the feast of holy Jacob (28 July), but the first written mention dates from the 16th of July 1615.

Geography and districts
The municipality lies at an altitude of 680–1156 metres and covers an area of 42.902 km². It has a population of about 5,000 people.

Parts of Zákamenné 
 
 Nižný koniec - entrance into village from Námestovo and Lokca. In this part are two banks, a supermarket, restaurant, pension, ski-lift, shops, health care and other services
 Poriečie - direction Novoť, to the polish border, village Ujsoly and frontier crossing
 Babinec
 Špitáľ or Ústredie - here is the municipal office, post, district bureau of employment, old church, school and kindergarten
 Farský Briežok
 Pri kríži
 Podkamenné
 Pri píle
 Trchovnica
 Oravice - entrance into the village from Čadca. In this part is a kindergarten and industrial zone
 Mrzáčka (upper, lower) - new church
 Vyšný koniec
 Tanečník - railway station

Historic landmarks and attractions 
 Calvary in Zákamenné
 Church of translation of Madonna in Zákamenné from year 1901. Built in Neoromance style. One from few churches with two towers in Orava region.
 Church of holy Joseph in Zákamenné - consecrated on 1 January 2000
 The Historical Logging Switchback Railway - Vychyľovka and Oravská Lesná. Narrow gauge railway pass steep elevation by switchbacks. Similar technical solution of similar difficult elevation was used only in Peru.
 Jewish cemetery
 Rowland stone

Tourism 
 Zákamenné belongs to the protected landscape area of Horná Orava and the specially protected area Horná Orava.
 In the village there are two ski-lifts: 1500 Kýčera and ski-lift 800 at Prípor hill
 The highest peak of Zákammené is Úšust (1156 m n.m.). It lies on the border with Poland and it is possible to see the West Tatras, Pilsko and Malá Fatra mountains in good weather conditions from this peak. On the Polish side of the mountain original fir-beech forests can be found.
 Accommodation is possible in four pensions and two hostels

Transportation into Zákamenné 
 By the car: from towns Námestovo, Čadca, Žywiec
 By the bus: directions Námestovo - Zákamenné, Dolný Kubín - Zákamenné and Kraľovany - Zákamenné, more at http://www.cp.sk or https://www.ubian.sk
 By the train: directions Bratislava-Žilina-Kraľovany nad Košice-Kraľovany. In the Kraľovany passage to bus, possible straight connection into Zákamenné on Saturday, Friday and Sunday.

Municipal office 
 Address: Zákamenné 746, 02956

Famous people 
Ján Vojtaššák - bishop in the region of Spiš during the years between the two World Wars and after World War II
Milan Čič - politician, former president of the constitutional court, presently an advisor of the president of the Slovak Republic
Martin Bajčičák - Slovakian cross-country skier who has been competing since 1994. Bajčičák's best finish at the Winter Olympics was also in the 15 km + 15 km double pursuit, eighth place in 2006.

References

External links
 Official website of the village Zákamenné
 Official website of the parish office Zákamenné
 https://web.archive.org/web/20070513023228/http://www.statistics.sk/mosmis/eng/run.html 
 Goral dialect from linguistic point of view – covering Zakamenné(in Slovak)

Villages in Slovakia